David Moore (born 4 April 1985 in Salford, Greater Manchester) is an English former football striker.

He made his first and only appearance for Wigan Athletic in August 2001 in a Football League Cup match against Blackpool. He was loaned out to Stalybridge Celtic in 2004, making four appearances, and then Bury in 2005, where he made three league appearances as a substitute, before being released at the end of the season.

He was signed by Hyde United, where he made two appearances. He then went on to play for Curzon Ashton and Ashton United before signing for Chorley in March 2007. He left the club in September 2007 and signed with Flixton.

References

External links

1985 births
Living people
Footballers from Salford
English footballers
Association football forwards
Wigan Athletic F.C. players
Stalybridge Celtic F.C. players
Bury F.C. players
English Football League players
Hyde United F.C. players
Curzon Ashton F.C. players
Ashton United F.C. players
Chorley F.C. players
Flixton F.C. players